Chloroselas trembathi is a butterfly in the family Lycaenidae. It is found in Kenya. The habitat consists of open savanna.

Adults have been recorded in December.

References

Butterflies described in 1991
Chloroselas
Endemic insects of Kenya
Butterflies of Africa